Adrian Molina (born August 23, 1985) is an American animator, storyboard artist, screenwriter, director, and lyricist. He has been at Pixar since 2007, where he started as a 2D animator on Ratatouille. He later moved on to be a storyboard artist, working on Toy Story 3 and Monsters University. After writing for The Good Dinosaur, Molina started his first assignment as a screenplay writer, for Coco, and later went on to co-direct the film.

He is now writing and directing an original feature-length film for Pixar, titled Elio. The film is set to release on March 1, 2024. Molina also illustrated the Little Golden Book for Toy Story 3.

A native of Northern California, he grew up in Grass Valley, California, and he graduated from Bear River High School in 2003, to subsequently attend and graduate from the California Institute of the Arts in 2007. He is of Mexican descent.

Filmography

References

External links 

 

1985 births
American male screenwriters
American lyricists
American people of Mexican descent
American storyboard artists
Animated film score composers
Animation screenwriters
Annie Award winners
American gay artists
American gay writers
LGBT animators
LGBT film score composers
American LGBT screenwriters
American LGBT songwriters
Gay screenwriters
Gay songwriters
Gay composers
Living people
People from Yuba City, California
Pixar people
Screenwriters from California
Songwriters from California